Leo Karner (born 4 November 1952) is an Austrian former cyclist. He competed in the team time trial event at the 1976 Summer Olympics.

References

External links
 

1952 births
Living people
Austrian male cyclists
Olympic cyclists of Austria
Cyclists at the 1976 Summer Olympics
People from Lilienfeld
Sportspeople from Lower Austria
20th-century Austrian people